Dilek Akagün Yılmaz (born 1963) is a Turkish politician.

Life
Dilek Akagün was born to Ali and Ümmü in Külköy village of Karahallı ilçe (district) in Uşak Province, Turkey in 1963.

In 1984, after completing the School of Law of the Dokuz Eylül University in İzmir, she began working as an attorney in Uşak. She is the charter member of the Uşak branch of Human Rights Association. She is also a member of Atatürkçü Düşünce Derneği (Atatürkist Thought Association) and the Çağdaş Yaşamı Destekleme Derneği (Association for the Support of Contemporary Living). She is married to Fuat Yılmaz, and the mother of two.

Politics
In 1988, she joined the Republican People's Party (CHP). In the local elections held on 26 March 1989, she was elected to the municipal council of Uşak. She ran for parliament and in the general election held on 12 June 2011, she was elected to the 24th Parliament of Turkey. In 2013 she accused a member of the party as being spy, and was warned by the party disciplinary committee. She ran for a second term in 2015, however she placed fourth in preselection denying her a place on the party list in Uşak.

References

Living people
1963 births
People from Karahallı
Dokuz Eylül University alumni
Turkish women lawyers
21st-century Turkish women politicians
Republican People's Party (Turkey) politicians
Members of the 24th Parliament of Turkey
20th-century Turkish lawyers
21st-century Turkish lawyers